Ermington can refer to:

 Ermington, Devon, a village in the county of Devon, England
 Ermington, New South Wales, a suburb of Sydney, Australia
 Ermington House, the residence of Edmund Lockyer in Ermington, Australia